Suam na mais is a Filipino corn soup with leafy vegetables (like moringa, bitter melon, or Malabar spinach leaves), and pork and/or shrimp. It originates from the province of Pampanga. It is also known as ginisang mais in Tagalog and sinabawang mais in the Visayan languages. It is served hot, usually during the rainy season.

See also
Ginataang mais
Binatog
List of maize dishes
Maíz con hielo

References

Maize
Maize dishes
Philippine soups